Yoon Sa-bong is a South Korean actress and singer. She made her debut in musical show "Nonsense" (2006). She also appeared in dramas, The Tale of Nokdu, Love Returns and Hi Bye, Mama!.

Biography and career
She was born on June 5 in 1980. She completed her studies from Kyungsung University. She made her debut as an actress in 2006. In 2008 she got Fox Award in 2nd Daegu Music Awards. After her debut as an actress, she has appeared in several films and television dramas including Hi Bye, Mama!, The Tale of Nokdu and Love Returns. She appeared in movies such as Finding Mr. Destiny and Kim Ji-young: Born 1982.

Filmography

Television series

Web series

Film

Theater

Awards and nominations
 2008 2nd Daegu Music Awards, Fox Award

References

External links 
 
 

1980 births
Living people
21st-century South Korean actresses
South Korean television actresses
South Korean film actresses